David Gibbs became the CEO of Yum! Brands Inc. on January 1, 2020. Before this promotion, he served as the company's president and chief operating officer beginning in January 2019, and president and chief financial officer before that. He became a director of the board in November 2019. Gibbs joined Yum! in 1989, and his service to the company has included worldwide planning, finance, international market management, overall operations and real estate. He was also CEO of Pizza Hut, which is owned by Yum!, president and CFO of Yum! Restaurants International, Yum! Brands chief strategy officer and served in various real estate and restaurant development leadership roles in KFC, Pizza Hut and Taco Bell. Gibbs received his BS in mathematics from the Johns Hopkins University and his MBA in finance from the Fuqua School of Business at Duke University.

References

Living people
American chief executives
Yum! Brands people
Fuqua School of Business alumni
Johns Hopkins University alumni
Year of birth missing (living people)